Plato (428/427 or 424/423 – 348/347 BCE) was a Greek philosopher.

Plato may also refer to:

People

Given name or nickname 
 Plato (comic poet)
 Plato (exarch), Byzantine exarch of Ravenna
 Plato II (1737–1812), Metropolitan of Moscow in 1775–1812
 Plato III (born 1993), American rapper
 Plato of Bactria (2nd century BCE), Greco-Bactrian king
 Plato of Sakkoudion (–814), Byzantine saint
 Plato Andros (1921–2008), American football player
 Plato Cacheris (1929–2019), American lawyer
 Plato T. Durham (1873–1930), American academic administrator
 Plato Fludd, American politician
 Plato Malinovsky, Metropolitan of Moscow in 1745–1754
 Plato Malozemoff (1909–1997), Russian-American engineer and businessman
 Plato E. Shaw (1883–1947), American historian
 Plato A. Skouras (1930–2004), American film producer
 Plato Tiburtinus, 12th-century Italian mathematician, astronomer and translator
 Plato von Ustinov (1840–1918), Russian-born German hotelier
 George Haimsohn (1925–2003), American photographer

Surname
 Ann Plato (born ), Black American author and educator
 Anton-Detlev von Plato (1910–2001), German general
 Burr Plato (–1905), Canadian political figure
 Chad Plato (born 1998), Nigerian rugby union player
 Dan Plato (born 1960), South African politician
 Dana Plato (1964–1999), American actress
 Fritz Plato (1858–1938), German chemist
 Jason Plato (born 1967), British racing driver
 Samuel Plato (1882–1957), American architect

Places
 Plato, Saskatchewan, Canada
 Plato, Magdalena, Colombia
 Plato Airport
 Plato Township, Kane County, Illinois, United States
 Plato, Indiana, United States
 Plato, Iowa, United States
 Plato, Minnesota, United States
 Plato, Missouri, United States
 Plato Island, Antarctica

Science and technology 
 Plato (spider), a genus of ray spider
 PLATO (computer system), a computer-assisted instruction system
 PLATO (spacecraft), an ESA space observatory, due to launch in 2026
 Plato (crater), a lunar crater
 5451 Plato, a main-belt asteroid
 SAM-A-19 Plato, an anti-ballistic missile project
 Plato scale, a scale for the gravity of beer wort and distilled spirits

Other uses
 Plato (film), a 2008 Russian film
 Plato (mythology), a son of Lycaon of Arcadia in Greek mythology
 Plato, a character in Rebel Without a Cause
 PLATO WA, or People Lobbying Against Teaching Outcomes, a Western Australian lobby group

See also
Play-Doh
Platon (disambiguation)